Valencian Left is a nationalist Valencian leftist party founded in the Valencian Community, founded in April, 1998 a group of ex-members of Unitat del Poble Valencià (Valencian People's Union) formed left this party and went to form a new political group using the vacant name of the historical Esquerra Valenciana. EV's current president is Robert Mora.

History
The dissidentgroup of members of Unitat del Poble Valencià who disagreed with UPV refounding itself as the Bloc Nacionalista Valencià (Valencian Nationalist Group) (BNV) and went to form their own political party under the EV acronym. The party defined itself as a party "of the National, Republican Left of the Valencian Community; that fights for political sovereignty and defends the free confederation of this territory with Catalonia and the Balearic Islands". 

In 2001 unsuccessful attempts were made towards a merger or alliance with Republican Left of the Valencian Country (ERPV). The agreement granted to the members of Valencian Esquerra (EV) a chair in the executive committee of ERPV for each 12 members who joined her. Later the new alliance would have stood under the designation EV-ERPV. EV took part in the 2003 Valencian Community elections as part of l'Entesa electoral coalition, together with Esquerra Unida and the Green Party of the Land of Valencia.  Although l'Entesa obtained 6 deputies not one of them was a member of EV. In the European elections of 2004 they were part of the Europa dels Pobles (Europe of the People) list together with ERC, Aralar and Chunta Aragonesista (other regional parties of the Spanish state).

References

External links 
 Esquerra Valenciana

Political parties in the Valencian Community
Secessionist organizations in Europe
Catalan nationalist parties
Political parties established in 1998
1998 establishments in Spain
Left-wing nationalist parties